Ain-Djoukar also known as Jougan is a locality in Tunisia, located at  36° 14' 50" N,  9° 56' 24" E. It is 371 meters above sea level and at the head waters of the Oued Miliane wadi. The springs at  this location near the Djebel Bargou mountains was recognised by the Romans as an important water source and a Roman aqueduct was constructed to Carthage. 

Remains of the aqueduct of Zaghouan can be seen today.

See also
Zaghouan Aqueduct

References

Roman towns and cities in Tunisia
Ancient Berber cities